Communist Party of India is a political party in India, the first communist party in the country. 

Communist Party of India may also refer to parties that split from it or were established later:

Communist Party of India (Marxist), national political party in India, the most prominent communist party in the country
Communist Party of India (Marxist–Leninist), defunct political party in India, which split into mutliple factions
Communist Party of India (Marxist–Leninist) Bolshevik
Communist Party of India (Marxist–Leninist) Central Team
Communist Party of India (Marxist–Leninist) Class Struggle
Communist Party of India (Marxist–Leninist) Janashakti
Communist Party of India (Marxist–Leninist) Liberation, the best known of the factions, simply known as CPI (ML)
Communist Party of India (Marxist–Leninist) (Mahadev Mukherjee)
Communist Party of India (Marxist–Leninist) MUC (Maoist Unity Centre)
Communist Party of India (Marxist–Leninist) Naxalbari
Communist Party of India (Marxist–Leninist) New Democracy
Communist Party of India (Marxist–Leninist) New Initiative
Communist Party of India (Marxist–Leninist) People's War
Communist Party of India (Marxist–Leninist) Red Flag
Communist Party of India (Marxist-Leninist) Red Flag (Unnichekkan), now Marxist-Leninist Party of India (Red Flag)
Communist Party of India (Marxist–Leninist) Red Star
Communist Party of India (Marxist–Leninist) Second Central Committee
Communist Party of India (Marxist–Leninist) Unity Initiative
Central Organising Committee, Communist Party of India (Marxist–Leninist)
Central Organising Committee, Communist Party of India (Marxist–Leninist) Party Unity
Central Organising Committee, Communist Party of India (Marxist–Leninist) Shantipal
Central Organising Committee, Communist Party of India (Marxist–Leninist) (Umadhar Singh)
Central Reorganisation Committee, Communist Party of India (Marxist–Leninist)
Provisional Central Committee, Communist Party of India (Marxist–Leninist)
Organising Committee, Communist Party of India (Marxist–Leninist)
Communist Party of India (Maoist), militant group, leading the Naxalite–Maoist insurgency in India
United Communist Party of India
Marxist Communist Party of India
Marxist Communist Party of India (United)
Revolutionary Communist Party of India
Revolutionary Communist Party of India (Das)
Revolutionary Communist Party of India (Tagore)
Communist Ghadar Party of India

See also
CPI (ML) (disambiguation), abbreviation for various factions of Communist Party of India (Marxist–Leninist)
List of communist parties in India